The 2017 Oceania Sevens Championship was the tenth Oceania Sevens in men's rugby sevens. It was held at ANZ Stadium in Suva, Fiji on 10–11 November 2017. The tournament was won by Fiji who defeated New Zealand 26–0 in the final.

Qualifiers
Aside from Australia, Fiji, New Zealand and Samoa, the tournament serves as a qualifier for the following:
 The 2018 Hong Kong Sevens qualifier tournament, with the top two competing for a chance to be a core team for the 2018–19 World Rugby Sevens Series.
 2018 Rugby World Cup Sevens, with the best performing team advancing. The second Oceania slot will be allocated to the winner of the 2017 Pacific Mini Games on 8−9 December.
 2018 Commonwealth Games, with the best-performing member of the Commonwealth of Nations qualifying.

Teams
Participating nations for the 2017 tournament are:

Pool stage
All times are Fiji Summer Time (UTC+13:00)

Pool A

Pool B

Pool C

Pool D

Knockout stage
9th-12th Place
{{Round4-with third|RD2=Ninth Place|Consol=Eleventh Place

|11 November 2017 – 12:20
||19||0
|11 November 2017 – 12:40
||34||10

|11 November 2017 - 16:26
||N/A||

|11 November 2017 - 16:06
||N/A||
}}5th-8th PlaceChampionship'''

Notes:

Placings

See also
 2018 Rugby World Cup Sevens qualifying – Men
 Rugby sevens at the 2018 Commonwealth Games – Men's tournament
 2017 Oceania Women's Sevens Championship

References

2017
2017 rugby sevens competitions
2017 in Oceanian rugby union
2017 in Fijian rugby union
International rugby union competitions hosted by Fiji
Sport in Suva
Oceania Sevens Championship